John Massey may refer to:

 John E. Massey (1819–1901), Lieutenant Governor of Virginia
 John Massey (artist) (born 1950), Canadian artist
 John Massey (cricketer) (1899–1963), English cricketer
 Jack Massey (footballer) (John Tolson Massey, died 1981), Australian rules footballer
 John Massey (poet), a conjectured author of Sir Gawain and the Green Knight
 Jack Massey (politician) (John Norman Massey, 1885–1964), New Zealand politician
 John Massey (prisoner), one-time longest serving prisoner in the United Kingdom
 John Massey (rugby league), rugby league footballer who played in the 1950s
 John Massey (MP) (fl. 1414), English Member of Parliament

See also
 John Massie (1842–1925), British academic, educationalist and Liberal Party politician 
 Jack Massey (disambiguation)